The Enzmann 506 was a Swiss automobile manufactured from 1957 until the late 1960s (some sources claim 1969 as the final year).  The company purchased new Volkswagens, unbolted the Beetle body shells from the floorpans, and refitted them with elegant fiberglass bodywork produced by a boatyard in Grandson. Some 100 cars were produced, and you could also buy separate fiberglass bodies to make the assembly yourself.   

The car's name—506—was nothing more than the stand number under which Enzmann debuted their creation at the 1957 Frankfurt Auto Show. Volkswagen engines, naturally, were fitted as standard, but the similar Porsche 356 powerplant was also easy to fit into the Beetle chassis. Some owners were also bold enough to add Okrasa tuning parts to these engines, with MAG or Judson Superchargers. 

As of 2009, it was reported that one could still buy an Enzmann body kit from the descendants of the car's creator.

See also

Volkswagen Karmann Ghia
Porsche 356
Porsche 914

References

Chris Rees, Rob de la Rive Box, Ton Lohman, 1998-1999 Classic Car Buyer's Guide.
David Burgess Wise and Lance Cole (eds.), The New Illustrated Encyclopedia of Automobiles.
Candace Weir, Dr J.Douglas Hale, Art History Prorfessor ASU, Tempe AZ, as a Roades Scholar recipient, in 1960, brought an Enzmann with a sliding top to Tempe, AZ.

External links
Enzmann 506 site

Cars of Switzerland
Defunct motor vehicle manufacturers of Switzerland